Aeonium gorgoneum is a species of flowering plant in the family Crassulaceae. The species is endemic to Cape Verde. It was first described by Johann Anton Schmidt in 1852. Its local name is saião. The plant plays a role in traditional medicine for the treatment of coughs.

Description
Its chromosome number is 2n=36.

Distribution and ecology

References

gorgoneum
Endemic flora of Cape Verde
Flora of Santo Antão, Cape Verde
Flora of São Vicente, Cape Verde
Flora of São Nicolau, Cape Verde